Desde Que Te Vi  is the debut album by Chilean pop rock band Natalino, released in August 2008.

Track listing

 Ángel Del Pasado
 ¿Y Qué Será?
 Y Es Por Eso
 Desde Que Te Vi
 Si Hablo De Ti, Hablo De Mí
 Cuando Me Hablan
 Desahogo
 En Aquella Tarde
 Me Volveré A Caer
 Maldición

2007 albums
Natalino albums
Spanish-language albums